Alison Louise Balsom, Lady Mendes,  (born 7 October 1978) is an English trumpet soloist, arranger, producer, and music educator. Balsom was awarded Artist of the Year at the 2013 Gramophone Awards and has won three Classic BRIT Awards and three German Echo Awards, and was a soloist at the BBC Last Night of the Proms in 2009. She was the artistic director of the 2019 Cheltenham Music Festival.

Early life and education

Balsom attended Tannery Drift First School in Royston, Hertfordshire, where she started taking trumpet lessons from the age of seven, followed by Greneway Middle School and Meridian School, whilst also playing in the Royston Town Band from ages 8 to 15. Subsequently, she took her A-levels at Hills Road Sixth Form College in Cambridge.

Playing in the National Youth Orchestra of Great Britain from ages 15 to 18, Balsom studied at the Guildhall School of Music and Drama, graduating in 2001 with first class honours and the Principal's Prize for the highest mark.  She has also studied at the Royal Scottish Academy of Music and Drama, and at the Conservatoire de Paris with Håkan Hardenberger.

Career

Balsom has been a professional solo classical trumpeter since 2001. She is a former BBC Radio 3 New Generation Artist, during which time she performed much of the major concerto repertoire for solo trumpet and orchestra with all of the BBC Orchestras, and she released her debut album with EMI Classics in 2002. In 2005, she released her second disc, Bach Works for Trumpet, as part of a contract with EMI Classics. In 2006, Balsom won 'Young British Classical Performer' at the Classical BRIT Awards and was awarded the 'Classic FM Listeners' Choice Award' at the Classic FM Gramophone Awards. She won 'Female Artist of the Year' at the 2009 and 2011 Classical BRIT Awards.

Her third album (the second disc in the EMI contract), Caprice, was released in September 2006, and her Italian Concertos disc was on the list of New York Times albums of the year. Balsom was a soloist at the 2009 Last Night of the Proms, performing, among other pieces, Haydn's Trumpet Concerto with the BBC Symphony Orchestra and a jazz arrangement of George Gershwin's "They Can't Take That Away from Me" with mezzo-soprano Sarah Connolly.

In collaboration with playwright Samuel Adamson, Balsom devised Gabriel, a play using the music of The Fairy-Queen and other pieces by Henry Purcell and George-Frideric Handel, which she performed with actors and The English Concert as part of the 2013 summer season at Shakespeare's Globe.

Balsom was the principal trumpet of the London Chamber Orchestra. Her main trumpet is a Bob Malone-converted Bach C trumpet. About her natural trumpet playing, Balsom said in 2014, "I have been playing since I was in the 3rd year at the Guildhall School of Music and Drama – so since I was 21. I just fell in love with this instrument as soon as I started learning it, as it makes total sense of the whole Baroque era in terms of phrasing, colour and the difference in keys and certain notes of the scale, which you lose on a modern instrument such as the piccolo trumpet. I play various different makes but my favourite is by Egger of Switzerland."

She is a Visiting Professor of Trumpet at the Guildhall School of Music and Drama.

She gave the world premiere of Qigang Chen's Joie éternelle for solo trumpet and orchestra at the 2014 BBC Proms, and Guy Barker's Lanterne of Light trumpet concerto at the 2015 BBC Proms. In addition to 14 years of solo appearances at the Proms, Balsom has also appeared at the iTunes Festival, Latitude Festival, Henley Festival, Un Violon Sur le Sable, France and Wege durch das Land, Germany.

In 2014 Balsom was chosen as one of 27 artists, including Stevie Wonder, Elton John, Florence Welch, and Sam Smith, to feature in one of BBC Music's first broadcasts, an extravagant cover of the 1966 Beach Boys classic, "God Only Knows", under the name of The Impossible Orchestra. This track marked a first-time collaboration between the Warner, Sony and Universal Music labels.

She appeared on BBC Radio 4’s long-running Desert Island Discs programme on 4 October 2015; her favourite piece of music was Bach's Brandenburg Concerto No. 5 in D major, her favourite book The Complete Scores of Bach, and her luxury item a trumpet.

Television presenter 
In 2014, she returned to BBC Young Musician of the Year as a presenter of the category finals and semi-final of the competition alongside Miloš Karadaglić. In 2016 she co-presented BBC Young Musician with Clemency Burton-Hill.

Festival director 
Balsom succeeded Richard Rodney Bennett as President of Deal, Kent Festival in 2015. She was artistic director of the 2019 Cheltenham Music Festival, then stepped down in July 2019 to concentrate on performing and recording.

Honours and awards 
Balsom was appointed an Officer of the Order of the British Empire (OBE) in the 2016 Birthday Honours for services to music.

She has been awarded Honorary Doctorates from the University of Leicester (2015)  and Anglia Ruskin University, and is an Honorary Fellow of the Guildhall School of Music and Drama.

Personal life

She has a son with the English conductor Edward Gardner. In 2017, she married film director Sir Sam Mendes. Their daughter was born later that year.

Discography

Music for Trumpet and Organ (EMI Classics Debut, 2002)
The Fam'd Italian Masters (Hyperion, 2003) - With Crispian Steele-Perkins
Bach works for Trumpet (EMI Classics, 2005)
Caprice (EMI Classics, 2006)
Haydn and Hummel Trumpet Concertos (EMI Classics, 2008)
Italian Concertos (EMI Classics, 2010)
Haydn and Hummel concertos / Albinoni's Oboe Concerto Op. 9 No. 2, transcribed for trumpet / Vivaldi's Violin Concerto Op. 3 No. 9, arranged for trumpet and instrumental trio (BBC Music Magazine, 2010)
Seraph: Trumpet Concertos by Arutiunian, MacMillan, and Zimmerman (EMI Classics, 2012)
Alison Balsom (EMI Classics, 2012)
Sound the Trumpet: Royal Music of Purcell and Handel, also marketed as; Kings & Queens (EMI Classics, 2012), and Sound the Trumpet-Gabriel Edition (Warner Classics, 2013)
Paris (Warner Classics, 2014)
Légende (Warner Classics, 2016)
Jubilo (Warner Classics, 2016) - Christmas Album including Fasch, Bach, Torelli and Corelli concerti
Royal Fireworks (Warner Classics, 2019)
Magic Trumpet (Warner Classics, 2020)
Quiet City (Warner Classics, 2022)

Awards

Artist of the Year, Gramophone Classical Music Awards, 2013
Nordoff Robbins O2 Silver Clef Award, 2014 
Best Female Artist, Classical BRIT Awards, 2009, 2011
Classic FM Listeners' Choice Award, Classic FM Gramophone Award 2006
Young British Performer, Classical BRIT Awards, 2006 
Feeling Musique Prize for quality of sound in the 4th Maurice André International Trumpet Competition
Concerto finalist in the BBC Young Musicians Competition, 1998

Equipment

Trumpet: Schilke models E3L E-flat/D trumpet, E3L-4 E-flat trumpet, G1L G/F trumpet, P7-4 B-flat/A piccolo trumpet, S22CHD C trumpet; mouthpiece: Schilke 6A4a.

References

External links

 
 Alison Balsom recordings on Warner Classics
 The trumpeter shaking up the classical music world – BBC interview
 Brits 2006 homepage
 Libertango at the 2009 Proms

1978 births
21st-century trumpeters
Alumni of the Guildhall School of Music and Drama
Alumni of the Royal Conservatoire of Scotland
Conservatoire de Paris alumni
BBC Radio 3 New Generation Artists
Brit Award winners
EMI Classics and Virgin Classics artists
English classical trumpeters
Living people
Musicians from Hertfordshire
Officers of the Order of the British Empire
People associated with the University of Leicester
People from Royston, Hertfordshire
21st-century English women musicians
21st-century English musicians
21st-century classical musicians
Wives of knights
Women trumpeters